Lesbian, gay, bisexual, and transgender (LGBT) persons in  Mauritius face legal challenges not experienced by non-LGBT residents. Sodomy (opposite-sex and same-sex anal and oral sex) is criminalized by Section 250 of the Criminal Code. Although same-sex relationships are not recognized in Mauritius, LGBT people are broadly protected from discrimination in areas such as employment, the provision of goods and services, etc., making it one of the few African countries to have such protections for LGBT people. The Constitution of Mauritius guarantees the right of individuals to a private life.

Mauritius is one of the 96 countries to have signed the "Joint Statement on Ending Acts of Violence Related Human Rights Violations Based on Sexual Orientation and Gender Identity" at the United Nations, condemning violence and discrimination against LGBT people. Furthermore, in recent years, there has been a growing acceptance towards LGBT people among Mauritius' population, particularly the younger generation, with polls indicating that it is one of Africa's most LGBT-friendly countries. Nevertheless, conservative attitudes about LGBT people are still commonplace.

Legality of same-sex sexual activity
According to an unofficial translation of Section 250 of the Mauritius Criminal Code of 1838, "Any person who is guilty of the crime of sodomy ... shall be liable to penal servitude for a term not exceeding 5 years."

In 2007, the Law Reform Commission recommended that sodomy be decriminalised and that Section 250 be repealed. Former Attorney General Rama Valayden sought to pass a bill, which would have decriminalised consensual same-sex sexual relationships, but the bill did not go through. Prosecutions under the law are rare. In 2015, however, a same-sex couple was arrested on the suspicion they were practising sodomy, and the law contributes to a general atmosphere of homophobia.

In 2017, the Mauritius Government said it would not repeal Section 250, stating that it would address the issue after further consideration. In October 2019, Abdool Ridwan Firaas Ah Seek, a 29-year-old LGBT rights activist, filed a case against Section 250 at the Supreme Court with the support of Collectif Arc-En-Ciel, the oldest LGBT NGO in the country. The plaintiff is represented by a legal team composed of Mr Gavin Glover SC and Ms Yanilla Moonshiram, barristers-at-law, and Ms Komadhi Mardemootoo, attorney-at-law. A first hearing occurred in November 2019. Director Aschwin Ramenah of the Collectif Arc-En-Ciel has said:

In October 2019, another group of young Mauritians also filed a constitutional challenge on the basis that Section 250 "violates their fundamental rights and freedom". These plaintiffs are represented by Dentons (Mauritius) LLP and the Franco-Mauritian Law Chambers LCMB et Associés, and supported by the Young Queer Alliance and the Love Honor Cherish Foundation. A first hearing occurred on 21 November 2019, with a second on 18 February 2020. The defendants are Attorney General Maneesh Gobin, the Director of Public Prosecutions and the Commissioner of Police. On 12 June 2020, the plaintiffs were granted leave to apply to the Supreme Court for constitutional redress. The defendants withdrew their objection to the leave application.

Recognition of same-sex relationships
Mauritius does not recognise same-sex marriage or civil unions.

In 2016, the Law Reform Commission was looking into a case to legalise same-sex marriage.

Adoption and family planning
According to a 2006 report, adoptive parents may be either single or married. LGBT persons are not specifically disqualified. According to the diplomatic website of the French Ministry of Foreign Affairs, single and married people are eligible to adopt children. It does not specify whether LGBT people are disqualified.

Discrimination protections
The Equal Opportunities Act 2008 prohibits both direct and indirect discrimination based on sexual orientation in employment, education, accommodation, disposal of immovable property, provision of goods and services, companies and partnerships, registered associations and clubs, sports and access to premises, with "sexual orientation" being defined to mean "homosexuality (including lesbianism), bisexuality or heterosexuality". The act does not currently protect transgender people.

Transgender rights
Currently, transgender people are not allowed to legally change their gender marker on official documents, such as passports, birth certificates and IDs.

Several reports about the lives of local transgender women have shown a growing acceptance of transgender people in Mauritian society, although prejudice still exists.

Blood donation
In 2014, the Ministry of Health amended blood donation policy to allow men who have sex with men to donate blood. Anecdotally, LGBTQI persons have been prevented from donating blood on occasion.

Living conditions
Mauritius is considered to be one of Africa's most LGBT-friendly countries, though LGBT people still face discrimination due to conservatives attitudes among the population. LGBT people may face discrimination, notably in public hospitals and bullying in schools.

AfriGay has reported that "whilst 'gay life' remains fairly quiet, mainly existing on the internet, in private and at the occasional party, the resorts are welcoming and non-discriminatory to all. For LGBT travelers there's little to worry about. No problems arising from LGBT couples sharing rooms during their holidays have been recorded."

Politics
Some politicians who have shown support for LGBT rights include former attorneys general Rama Valayden and Ravi Yerigadoo, former prime ministers Navin Ramgoolam and Paul Bérenger, MPs Joanna Bérenger and Tania Diolle, and former Minister of Public Service, Administrative and Institutional Reforms Alain Wong.

LGBT rights organisations
In Mauritius, there are four organisations that work for the rights of the LGBT community: Collectif Arc-En-Ciel, Young Queer Alliance, Association VISA G and PILS.

Founded in 2005, Collectif Arc-En-Ciel ("Rainbow Collective") is the pioneer and main organisation for the LGBT community in Mauritius. The group organised the first Pride in Mauritius and has been doing so for the last fifteen years, gathering more than 1,200 participants in 2016. The organisation also fights against homophobia and discrimination based on sexual orientation and gender identity through numerous other campaigns. In 2016, the organisation moved the Pride march from a small town, Rose-Hill, to Port Louis, the capital. In 2018, religious extremists held a violent counter-march, and a strong police force was deployed to provide protection to the Pride marchers.

Founded on 1 September 2014, Young Queer Alliance is an organisation for the young LGBT community in Mauritius. The Young Queer Alliance engages in support, advocacy and campaigns against discrimination. Association VISA G is an organisation mainly for transgender individuals.

Founded in 1996, PILS (Prévention Information Lutte contre le Sida) is a centre for individuals with HIV/AIDS in the country, and also a place for the prevention and education of people living with HIV/AIDS.

In 2014, Moments.mu became the first travel agency in Mauritius to dedicate their services to the LGBT community.

In June 2018, the Pride march organised by Collectif Arc-En-Ciel was annulled because of hundreds of death threats believed to originate from religious extremists. In addition, a counter-protest against LGBT rights was organised by Javed Meetoo, a known Islamic extremist already under surveillance according to Mauritian authorities. Many important religious figures on the island, including Cardinal Maurice Piat, firmly condemned the protest against LGBT rights and called for respect and tolerance for all. An LGBT sit-in took place a few days later at the Caudan Waterfront in the capital, with the support of Prime Minister Pravind Jugnauth.

Public opinion
A 2016 poll found that 49% of Mauritians would like or not mind having an LGBT neighbor.

Summary table

See also

 Human rights in Africa
 LGBT rights in Africa

Notes

References

External links
 Gay Mauritius News & Reports (GlobalGayz)
 Official website of LGBT Mauritius

Mauritius
LGBT in Mauritius
Human rights in Mauritius
Law of Mauritius